The F2 World Championship is an international powerboat racing competition organised by the Union Internationale Motonautique.

The Boats 

The carbon fibre catamaran hulls are powered by Mercury Racing OptiMax 2.5XS outboards.

Qualifying 

Qualifying periods (Q1, Q2 & a shoot out) decide the formation of the grid.

Races 

Each race lasts approximately 45 minutes following a circuit marked out in a selected stretch of water, usually a lake, river, dock, or sheltered bay.

2020 UIM F2 World Championship 

Portugal's Duarte Benavente won the 2020 UIM F2 World Championship with Edgaras Riabko from Lithuania second and Britain's Owen Jelf third.

Due to the COVID-19 pandemic, a shortened season was held over three rounds in two countries, Lithuania and Portugal.

UIM F2 World Champions

References

World championships in motorboat racing